Polychaetus is a genus of beetles in the family Carabidae, containing the following species:

 Polychaetus dejeani Chaudoir, 1882
 Polychaetus egregius (Chaudoir, 1854)

References

Licininae